The Men's FITA Round Open was one of the events held in Archery at the 1972 Summer Paralympics in Heidelberg.

There were 36 competitors in the event.

E. Hammel of West Germany won the gold medal.

Report
In this event and a 36-strong field, it was anyone's game but the local hero was E. Hammel who stunned the opposition and took the Paralympic gold, beating his rival, Australian Roy Fowler, by 86 points. The Dutchman, Popke Popkema, was in defence of his Paralympic title but had to settle for third place and a bronze medal.

Hammel would also win the gold in the team event, with his German team-mates and also win gold in dartchery completing a 100% record for the archer in his home Paralympics.

Results

Final

References 

Men's FITA Round Open